London Gryphons is a Canadian women's soccer team, founded in 2004. The team is a member of the USL W-League, the second tier of women's soccer in the United States and Canada.  The team plays its home games at North London Stadium in the city of London, Ontario. The club's colours are navy blue, white and red.

For 2010 season the team played in the Midwest Division of the Central Conference. For 2011 season, London Gryphons returns in the Great Lakes Division of the Central Conference and play against teams from Laval, Hamilton, Quebec, Ottawa, Rochester and Toronto.

Players
The following former players have played at the senior international and/or professional level:
 Sylvia Gee

Year-by-year
See also:  2004 season
See also:  2005 season
See also:  2006 season
See also:  2007 season
See also:  2008 season
See also:  2009 season
See also:  2010 season
See also:  2011 season

External links
Official web site of London Gryphons
London Gryphons on USL Soccer Site

Sports teams in London, Ontario
Women's soccer clubs in Canada
Soccer clubs in Ontario
United Soccer League teams based in Canada
USL W-League (1995–2015) teams
2004 establishments in Ontario